The Salt War was a brief war between Venice and Padua over salt works in 1304. Venice was victorious and its salt monopoly was confirmed.

Background

Genesis of the dispute
On 9 July 1291, Venice and Padua signed a treaty of alliance to last for nine years. In 1299, Padua acted as surety for Venice in its peace treaty with Genoa following the War of Curzola. With the expiration of the treaty in 1300, tensions between the two cities immediately rose. The dispute that turned into open warfare began in 1303. It was a dispute over Padua's right to construct salt pans on the swampy peninsula of Calcinara on the Lagoon near the frontier with Chioggia. The Paduan commune had acquired the land at Calcinara from Gualpertino, the abbot of Santa Giustina and brother of the poet Albertino Mussato. The salt works may have been started under the monks. Venice, however, claimed a monopoly on supplying salt to the surrounding area. They also sought to stop the Chioggians from working with the Paduans.

Preparations for war
In an effort to prevent the dispute from turning into a war, Padua sent Giovanni Caligine on a diplomatic mission to Venice. Caligine may also have had a hand in the diplomatic revolution that ended in Padua's alliance with Verona. Negotiations between Padua and Verona took place in March–April, with the personal intervention of Alboino della Scala. The treaty with Verona was signed in Padua on 18 May 1304. Among the signatories were the poet Lovato Lovati and his friend Zambono di Andrea. As a result, Padua's traditional enemy remained neutral during the conflict with Venice. Padua called upon Vicenza, Bassano and Treviso for support. Venice was supported by the D'Este and Da Camino and by the patriarchate of Aquileia.

War and treaty
To defend the salt works, Padua constructed a fortress at Petadibò. By the time Padua had worked out an alliance with Verona, the war was well under way. Simone da Vigodarzere was the Paduan commander. The war was an especially bloody one. In the end, the Paduans were routed and the salt pans destroyed. Treviso, under Rizzardo IV da Camino, ultimately interceded to end the war.

Padua was represented by Caligine at the peace conference in Treviso. Among the witnesses was the local Franciscan custos, Paolino Veneto. According to the terms of the treaty, all the fortresses built during the war by either side were to be destroyed. The border between Venice and Padua was also adjusted in the former's favour, to remove the former salt works from the latter's jurisdiction.

Aftermath
Following the peace, the Paduan poets and early humanists Mussato and Lovato exchanged verses on the war. Lovato wrote three poems in this exchange (numbered 27, 28 and 30) and Mussato wrote two (29 and 31), althoug the order in which they were written is a matter of dispute. Lovato asked Mussato whether he thought the peace could last, given that, through terms that favoured Venice, Padua's "wounded liberty might be the cause of a second conflict." He thought that they should pretend to be satisfied with the terms since "peace, even a simulated one, is peace: often the true follows the feigned." Mussato, however, preferred to denounce the Treaty of Treviso. Otherwise, Paduan sources have say little about the war. One of the best accounts is found the Historia of Ferreto de' Ferreti of Vicenza. The war is mentioned in Riccobaldo of Ferrara's Compilatio chronologica. Marino Sanudo Torsello was also a witness of the war. On the whole, "the chroniclers seem to endorse the Venetian version of the rupture" with Padua.

Notes

References

Works cited

1304 in Europe
14th century in the Republic of Venice
Conflicts in 1304
Salt 1304
History of Padua